Susan Brady  is an American psychologist and literacy expert who is a professor of school psychology at the University of Rhode Island. For many years, she led the Haskins Literacy Initiative  at Haskins Laboratories in New Haven, Connecticut which promotes the "science of teaching reading."  She has been a leading researcher in the area of reading acquisition for over thirty years and has been involved with efforts to improve state and national policy on the teaching of reading including speaking before a U.S. Senate committee.

Selected publications
 Brady, S., Shankweiler, D., & Mann, V. (1983). Speech perception and memory coding in relation to reading ability. Journal of Experimental Child Psychology, 35, 345–367.
 Brady, S. (1986). Short-term Memory, Phonological Processing and Reading Ability. Annals of Dyslexia, Vol. 36, 138–153.
 Brady, S., Mann, V., & Schmidt, R. (1987). Errors in short-term memory for good and poor readers. Memory & Cognition, 15(5), 444–453.
 Brady, S.A. & Fowler, A.E. (1988). Phonological Precursors to reading acquisition. Malsand, R.A.. & Masland, M.W. (eds.) Preschool Prevention of Reading Failure. pp. 204–215. Parkton, MD, York Press.
 Brady, S., Poggie, E., & Rapala, M. M. (1990). Speech Repetition Abilities in Children Who Differ in Reading Skill. Language and Speech, 32(2), 109–122.
 Brady, S., Fowler, A., Stone, B., & Winbury, N. (1994). Training Phonological Awareness: A Study with Inner-City Kindergarten Children. Annals of Dyslexia, 44, 26–59.
 Brady, S.A. (1997).  Ability to encode phonological representations:  An underlying difficulty of poor readers.  In B. Blackman (Ed.), Foundations of reading acquisition and dyslexia:  Implications for early intervention.  Lawrence Erlbaum Associates, Hillsdale, NJ. (pp. 2–28).
 Brady, S., & Dietrich, J. A. (2001). Phonological representations of adult poor readers: An investigation of specificity and stability. Applied Psycholinguistics, 22, 383–418.
 Scarborough, H.S. & Brady, S.A. (2002). Toward a common terminology for talking about speech and reading: a glossary of the "phon" words and some related terms. Journal of Literacy Research, V.34, No. 3, pp. 299–336.
 Shankweiler, D., Lundquist, E., Katz, L., Stuebing, K. K., Fletcher, J. M., Brady, S., Fowler, A., Dreyer, L. G., Marchione, K. E., Shaywitz, S. E., & Shaywitz, B. A. (1999). Comprehension and decoding: Patterns of association in children with reading difficulties. Scientific Studies of Reading, 3, 69–94.
 Brady, S., Braze, D., & Fowler, C. A. (Eds.). (2011). "Explaining individual differences in reading: Theory and evidence". New York: Psychology Press.
 Brady, S. (2011). Efficacy of phonics teaching for reading outcomes: Indications from post-NRP research. In S. A. Brady, D. Braze & C. A. Fowler (Eds.), "Explaining individual differences in reading: Theory and evidence". New York: Psychology Press.

External links
 Haskins Literacy Initiative
 University of Rhode Island School Psychology

American women psychologists
21st-century American psychologists
University of Rhode Island faculty
Haskins Laboratories scientists
Dyslexia researchers
Place of birth missing (living people)
Year of birth missing (living people)
Living people
Speech perception researchers
American women academics
21st-century American women